There have been four baronetcies created for persons with the surname Hall, one in the Baronetage of Nova Scotia and three in the Baronetage of the United Kingdom. Three of the creations are extant as of 2010.

The Hall Baronetcy, of Dunglass in the County of Haddington, was created in the Baronetage of Nova Scotia on 8 October 1687 for John Hall. The fourth Baronet was a politician, geologist and geophysicist. The tenth Baronet was Director of the Food Section at the Ministry of Munitions during the First World War and subsequently Chief Reconstruction Officer for Scotland at the Ministry of Labour. The fourteenth Baronet was Governor of British Somaliland.

The Hall Baronetcy, of Llanover in the County of Monmouthshire, was created in the Baronetage of the United Kingdom in July 1838. For more information on this creation, see Benjamin Hall, 1st Baron Llanover.

The Hall Baronetcy, of Burton Park, in the parish of Burton in the County of Sussex, was created in the Baronetage of the United Kingdom on 18 September 1919 for the Conservative politician Douglas Hall. He was the son of Bernard Hall, the first ever Mayor of Liverpool.

The Hall Baronetcy, of Grafham in the County of Surrey, was created in the Baronetage of the United Kingdom on 5 March 1923 for the businessman and Conservative politician Frederick Hall.

Hall baronets, of Dunglass (1687) 
Sir John Hall, 1st Baronet (died 1695), twice Lord Provost of Edinburgh
Sir James Hall, 2nd Baronet (died 1742) Hall married (as his 2nd wife) Margaret Pringle, daughter of Sir John Pringle, 2nd Bart of Stichill. They had issue.
Sir John Hall, 3rd Baronet (died 1776)
Sir James Hall, 4th Baronet (1761–1832)
Sir John Hall, 5th Baronet FRS (1787–1860)
Sir James Hall, 6th Baronet (1824–1876)
Sir Basil Francis Hall, 7th Baronet (1832–1909)
Sir Henry John Hall, 8th Baronet (1835–1913)
Sir John Richard Hall, 9th Baronet (1865–1928)
Sir Martin Julian Hall, 10th Baronet (1874–1958)
Sir Julian Henry Hall, 11th Baronet (1907–1974)
Sir Lionel Reid Hall, 12th Baronet (1898–1975)
Sir Neville Reynolds Hall, 13th Baronet (1900–1978)
Sir Douglas Basil Hall, 14th Baronet (1909–2004)
Sir John Douglas Hoste Hall, 15th Baronet (born 1945)

The heir apparent is the present holder's son Thomas James Hall (born 1975).

Hall baronets, of Llanover (1838)
 see Benjamin Hall, 1st Baron Llanover

Hall baronets, of Burton Park (1919)

Sir Douglas Bernard Hall, 1st Baronet (1866–1923)
Sir Douglas Montgomery Bernard Hall, 2nd Baronet (1891–1962)
Sir John Bernard Hall, 3rd Baronet (1932–2018)
Sir David Bernard Hall, 4th Baronet (born 1961)

There is no heir to the title.

Hall baronets, of Grafham (1923)
Sir Frederick Hall, 1st Baronet (1864–1932)
Sir Frederick Henry Hall, 2nd Baronet (1899–1949)
Sir (Frederick) John Frank Hall, 3rd Baronet (1931–2013)
Sir David Christopher Hall, 4th Baronet (born 1937)

The heir apparent is the present holder's son John Christopher Hall (born 1965)

Notes

References
Kidd, Charles, Williamson, David (editors). Debrett's Peerage and Baronetage (1990 edition). New York: St Martin's Press, 1990.

Obituary: Sir Douglas Hall, 14th Baronet. The Daily Telegraph.(archived copy)
Portrait of Madeleine (nee Pringle), Lady Hall of Dunglass. Retrieved 18 June 2008.
Sir John Hall, 5th Baronet's memorial at Dunglass Church

Baronetcies in the Baronetage of Nova Scotia
Baronetcies in the Baronetage of the United Kingdom
Extinct baronetcies in the Baronetage of the United Kingdom
1687 establishments in Nova Scotia
1838 establishments in the United Kingdom